The California Sunshine was an American soccer club based in Fountain Valley, California that was a member of the American Soccer League. The team was owned by Dr. Robert Everakes and his wife Alexandra, who was the general manager. Their home games were held at Orange Coast Community College  in Costa Mesa, California and at El Camino Community College in Torrance, California but had exhibition games at the University of California in Riverside, California and Palm Springs Stadium in Palm Springs, California. Their first season  was 1977, but the team folded in 1981 after four seasons. The head coach was Derek Lawther.

The California Sunshine Soccer Team was founded in 1977 by Warren Hoffnung (a nuclear physicist, aerospace executive and entrepreneur – currently CEO of MyWrapper, a software company that sells software for creating personalized candy wrappers) and Lee Andrews (a financial advisor). They acquired the Orange County, California territorial rights in the American Soccer League, the oldest U.S. professional soccer league. The commissioner of the ASL at the time was basketball great Bob Cousy and there were teams spread across the U.S. A little known fact is that the California Sunshine approved the move of the NASL's St. Louis Stars to Anaheim Stadium where it was renamed the California Surf. The California Sunshine was founded with two major philosophies: To field as many American players as possible and to keep profanity off the playing field. The goal was to encourage American youth to be able to attend the matches and see how soccer could be an important part of their sports participation. In fact, all but one of the players were American.

Year-by-year

Honors
MVP
 1979  Poli Garcia

Coach of the Year
 1978 Derek Lawther

First Team All Star
 1977 Tony Douglas
 1979 Tom Reynolds, Ramon Moraldo, Don Tobin, Poli Garcia

References
California Sunshine (Soccer)

American Soccer League (1933–1983) teams
Defunct soccer clubs in California
Fountain Valley, California
Sports in Orange, California
Sports in Santa Ana, California
Association football clubs established in 1977
1977 establishments in California
Soccer clubs in California
Association football clubs disestablished in 1981
1981 disestablishments in California